Kangxin Highway is a station on Line 11 of the Shanghai Metro. It opened on December 19, 2015, as the terminus of an extension of Line 11 beyond  station. After the opening of the Shanghai Disney Resort,  station became the new terminus of the line.

This station used to be known as Hengxin Road.

References

Railway stations in Shanghai
Line 11, Shanghai Metro
Shanghai Metro stations in Pudong
Railway stations in China opened in 2015